Joseph Kerrigan may refer to:
 Joe Kerrigan, former relief pitcher and longtime pitching coach in Major League Baseball
 J. M. Kerrigan, character actor who has a star on the Hollywood Walk of Fame